Joseph Lyman DeRisi is an American biochemist, specializing in molecular biology, parasitology, genomics, virology, and computational biology.

Early life and education
DeRisi was raised in Carmichael, California, where he graduated from Del Campo High School. He received a B.A. in Biochemistry and Molecular Biology in 1992 from the University of California, Santa Cruz.

DeRisi earned his Ph.D. in Biochemistry from Stanford University in 1999. Working in the laboratory of Patrick O. Brown, he developed methods for the production and use of DNA microarrays in molecular biology, and his thesis was a genome-wide expression analysis of the budding yeast S. cerevisiae. Upon graduation, DeRisi accepted a position as a Sandler Fellow at the University of California San Francisco.

Career
Joseph DeRisi is a co-president of the Chan Zuckerberg Biohub, and Chair of the Department of Biochemistry and Biophysics at the University of California, San Francisco (UCSF) with a joint appointment at the California Institute for Quantitative Biosciences (QB3). He is a former Howard Hughes Medical Institute (HHMI) Investigator.

DeRisi's best-known achievements are printing the first whole genome expression array, performing the first broad analysis of differential gene expression in cancer cells, profiling gene expression throughout the lifecycle of the malaria-causing protozoan Plasmodium falciparum, his discovery of the SARS virus, and pioneering virus discovery using gene hybridization array and DNA sequencing technologies.

DeRisi uses microarrays extensively in his work, and has designed and built both hardware and software for microarrays. He is a proponent of open access to microarray technology, and maintains a website with software and protocols for microarray operations. He is also a proponent of open access publishing, and has publications in the Public Library of Science journals.

DeRisi has identified putative disease-causing viruses in humans (cancer, SARS, other respiratory infections, paraneoplastic encephalitis, etc.), and animals ranging from parrots and cockatiels to honeybees and boa constrictors. He and a research partner, Don Ganem, have identified a parasite, Nosema ceranae, that appears to be responsible for colony collapse among honeybees. He has also de-bunked the relation of viruses to certain subsets of human cancer.

Perhaps most relevant to contemporary global health, based on extensive characterization of the malaria-causing pathogen, Plasmodium falciparum, DeRisi's group has developed profoundly promising candidate drugs to cure malaria.

In 2004 DeRisi was named a MacArthur fellow (the "Genius" award), in 2008 was awarded the 14th Annual Heinz Award for Technology, the Economy, and Employment, in 2013 was elected as a fellow of the California Academy of Sciences and to the Academy of the American Society of Microbiology, and in 2014 he received the John J. Carty Award for the Advancement of Science from the National Academy of Sciences. In 2015, he was elected to the American Academy of Arts and Sciences, and in 2016 he was elected to the National Academy of Sciences and the National Academy of Medicine.

He was involved in the  development of the ViroChip, which is used to rapidly identify viruses in bodily fluids. It was used to help identify the Severe acute respiratory syndrome virus in 2003.  He has also been involved in the development of an online platform called IDseq, backed by the Chan Zuckerberg Initiative and Chan Zuckerberg Biohub, which is used to identify viruses from metagenomic sequencing data. In 2018 as part of this work DeRisi and colleagues identified the drug nitroxoline as a compound that could be repurposed as possible amoebicidal agent against Balamuthia mandrillaris which causes granulomatous amoebic encephalitis (GAE) a fatal disease, in 2021 a man that had not responded with recommended drug therapy recovered after nitroxoline was added to the regime.

In 2020, during the COVID-19 pandemic, DeRisi led a team that turned an empty lab space adjacent to the CZ Biohub into a CLIA-certified COVID-19 testing facility in eight days. CLIAhub became one of the nation's leading COVID-19 testing centers, processing thousands of tests per day and becoming a model for the nation.

At the same time, DeRisi became an active proponent of developing a national COVID-19 surveillance system to identify and monitor the COVID-19 virus' mutations.

Awards 
 2001 Searle Scholar Award, The Searle Scholars Program, Northbrook IL
 2001 JP Morgan Chase Health Award, The Tech Museum of Innovation, San Jose CA
 2002 Gordon Tomkins Chair of Biochemistry and Biophysics, University of California, San Francisco
 2003 Packard Fellowship for Science and Engineering, David and Lucile Packard Foundation, Los Altos, CA
 2004 MacArthur Fellowship, The John D. and Catherine T. MacArthur Foundation, Chicago, IL
 2004 Wired RAVE Award, Health and Medicine, WIRED Magazine, San Francisco, CA
 2005 BayBio Scientific Achievement Award, BayBio, San Francisco, CA
 2006 Alumni Achievement Award, University of California, Santa Cruz, Santa Cruz, CA
 2007 Chabot Science Award, Chabot Space & Science Center, Oakland, CA
 2008 The 14th Annual Heinz Award for Technology, the Economy and Employment, Pittsburgh, PA

References

External links 
 DeRisi Lab
 Joseph DeRisi, Ph.D., bio on site of the Howard Hughes Medical Institute
 microarrays.org (Internet Archive copy)
 Joseph L. DeRisi, profile on the Searle Scholars Program site
 Tech Awards, 2001 Health Award Laureate, Joseph L. DeRisi
 Packard Fellowship for Science and Engineering
 2004 MacArthur Fellows Announcement
 2004 Wired RAVE Awards
 BayBio Pantheon
 Alumni Achievement Awards
 2007 Chabot Science Award
 The Heinz Awards, Joseph DeRisi profile
 

Year of birth missing (living people)
Living people
MacArthur Fellows
University of California, San Francisco faculty
Howard Hughes Medical Investigators
Stanford University School of Medicine alumni
University of California, Santa Cruz alumni
American molecular biologists
American virologists
Members of the United States National Academy of Sciences
Fellows of the American Academy of Microbiology
Members of the National Academy of Medicine